KXTA-FM (99.1 MHz) is a commercial radio station located in Gooding, Idaho, broadcasting to the Twin Falls/Sun Valley, Idaho area. KXTA-FM airs a Regional Mexican format. KXTA-FM is known as "99.1 Y 93.5 La Perrona."

KXTA-HD2
On February 4, 2019, KXTA-HD2 changed their format from top 40/CHR as Club 97.5, to bilingual CHR, branded as "LatinX 97.5".

References

External links
KXTA-FM website

XTA-FM